Gulkana can mean the following,
 Gulkana, Alaska, a census-designated place (CDP) in Valdez-Cordova Census Area, Alaska, U.S.
 Gulkana Glacier , glacier that flows from the ice fields of the south flank of the eastern Alaska Range
 Gulkana River, a 60-mile (97 km) tributary of the Copper River in the U.S. state of Alaska